Jaan Tõnisson's third cabinet was in office in Estonia from 9 December 1927 to 4 December 1928, when it was succeeded by August Rei's cabinet.

Members

This cabinet's members were the following:

References

Cabinets of Estonia